German submarine U-604 was a Type VIIC U-boat built for Nazi Germany's Kriegsmarine for service during World War II.
She was laid down on 27 February 1941 by Blohm & Voss in Hamburg as yard number 580, launched on 16 November 1941 and commissioned on 8 January 1942 under Kapitänleutnant Horst Höltring (German Cross in Gold).

Design
German Type VIIC submarines were preceded by the shorter Type VIIB submarines. U-604 had a displacement of  when at the surface and  while submerged. She had two shafts and two  propellers.

U-604 was fitted with five  torpedo tubes (four fitted at the bow and one at the stern), fourteen torpedoes, one  SK C/35 naval gun, 220 rounds, and a  C/30 anti-aircraft gun. The boat had a complement of between forty-four and sixty.

Service history
The boat's service began on 8 January 1942 for training as part of the 5th U-boat Flotilla. After training was completed she transferred to the 9th flotilla on 1 August 1942 for active service.

Wolfpacks

She took part in five wolfpacks, namely:
 Vorwärts (25 August – 1 September 1942)
 Streitaxt (20 – 31 October 1942)
 Draufgänger (1 – 11 December 1942)
 Ungestüm (11 – 22 December 1942)
 Knappen (19 – 25 February 1943)

Fate
She was scuttled on 11 August 1943 at position  in the South Atlantic after being depth charged by two US aircraft, a Ventura and a Liberator.

Summary of raiding history

References

Bibliography

External links

Ships lost with all hands
German Type VIIC submarines
1941 ships
U-boats commissioned in 1942
U-boats sunk in 1943
U-boats sunk by US aircraft
World War II submarines of Germany
World War II shipwrecks in the South Atlantic
Ships built in Hamburg
Maritime incidents in August 1943